Pierre Palau (13 August 1883 – 3 December 1966), often known simply as Palau, was a French actor.

Palau was born Pierre Palau del Vitri in Paris and died at age 83 in Meudon, Hauts-de-Seine, France.

Partial filmography
 When Do You Commit Suicide? (1931)
 Luck (1931)
 Monsieur Albert (1932)
 La dame de chez Maxim's (1933)
 Zouzou (1934)
 The Typist Gets Married (1934)
 The Midnight Prince (1934)
 Fanfare of Love (1935)
 Tovaritch (1935)
 Girls of Paris (1936)
 The Green Jacket (1937)
 The Man from Nowhere (1937)
 Rasputin (1938)
 Crossroads (1938)
 The Lafarge Case (1938)
 The Phantom Carriage (1939)
 Annette and the Blonde Woman (1942)
 I Am with You (1943)
 La Main du diable (1943)
 Box of Dreams (1945)
 Mademoiselle X (1945)
 Boule de suif (1945)
 Messieurs Ludovic (1946)
 The Queen's Necklace (1946)
 Jericho (1946)
 The Uncatchable Mr. Frederic (1946)
 The Sea Rose (1946)
Rumours (1947)
 The Royalists (1947)
 The Dance of Death (1948)
 The Farm of Seven Sins (1949)
 Dakota 308 (1951)
 The Road to Damascus (1952)
 On Trial (1954)
 Nana (1955)
 Marguerite de la nuit (1955)
 If Paris Were Told to Us (1956)
 King of Hearts (1966)

External links

1883 births
1966 deaths
French male film actors
French male silent film actors
Male actors from Paris
20th-century French male actors